WLHS is a radio station (89.9 FM) licensed to West Chester, Ohio, United States.

WLHS may also refer to:

Schools
 West Lafayette Junior-Senior High School, in West Lafayette, Indiana, United States
 West Laurens High School, in Dexter, Georgia, United States
 West Leeds High School, in Armley, Leeds, West Yorkshire, England
 West Lincoln High School, in Lincoln County, North Carolina, United States
 West Linn High School, in West Linn, Oregon, United States
 West Lutheran High School, in Plymouth, Minnesota, United States
 Whitmore Lake High School, in Whitmore Lake, Michigan, United States
 Wilde Lake High School, in Columbia, Maryland, United States
 Wisconsin Labor History Society of Milwaukee, Wisconsin, USA
 Wisconsin Lutheran High School, in Milwaukee, Wisconsin, United States
 Wu-Ling Senior High School, in Taoyuan City, Taiwan

Other
 Wisconsin Labor History Society